Serpent Mounds Park is a former historical and recreational park located in Keene, Ontario, Canada. Serpent Mounds operated as a provincial park, established in 1955 through a lease with the Hiawatha First Nation, a historic Mississaugas people. During this time, in 1982, the mounds were designated a National Historic Site, comprising six sites, including on east Sugar Island.

From 1995 to 2009, the Hiawatha First Nation operated the park privately, offering camping facilities, beach access on Rice Lake, a cultural centre, and interpretive walks among the historic serpent and nearby mounds. They closed the park in 2009 because of a decline in tourism.

History
Archaeological field work at the campground revealed that the construction and early occupation of the Serpent Mounds area occurred about 2000 years ago during the prehistoric Middle Woodland Period. The first prehistoric peoples to occupy the site were classified by archaeologists as the Point Peninsula complex, based on their artifacts.
  
The people occupied areas of what are now the jurisdictions of central and southeastern Ontario and southwestern Quebec in Canada, and northern parts of New York state in the United States, between 300BC and 700AD.

Attractions
Serpent Mounds Park offered many activities, including:

Native American art workshops
Birdwatching
Swimming
Fishing
Boating

See also
Earthwork (archaeology)
Effigy mound
List of National Historic Sites in Ontario
Mound
 Mound builder (people)
Serpent Mound, a similar effigy mound in Ohio, USA

References

Literature 
 W. A. Kenyon, Mounds of Sacred Earth - Burial Mounds of Ontario. Royal Ontario Museum, 1986. ROM Archaeology Monograph 9.

External links
Hiawatha First Nation Serpent Mounds Park information

Point Peninsula Complex
Mounds
Parks in Ontario
First Nations in Ontario
National Historic Sites in Ontario
Geography of Peterborough County
Protected areas of Peterborough County
Tourist attractions in Peterborough County
1st millennium in Canada
Archaeological sites in Ontario